El Salvador observes Central Standard Time (UTC−6) year-round.

IANA time zone database 
In the IANA time zone database, El Salvador is given one zone in the file zone.tab—America/El_Salvador. "SV" refers to the country's ISO 3166-1 alpha-2 country code. Data for El Salvador directly from zone.tab of the IANA time zone database; columns marked with * are the columns from zone.tab itself:

References

External links 
Current time in El Salvador at Time.is
Time in El Salvador at TimeAndDate

Time in El Salvador